Khokhar are a tribe native to the Pothohar Plateau of Pakistani Punjab and the Indian states of Punjab and Haryana. The word "Khokhar" itself is of Persian origin and means "bloodthirsty". Khokhars predominantly follow Islam while some continue to follow Hinduism in India. Many Khokhars converted to Islam from Hinduism after coming under the influence of Baba Fariduddin Ganjshakar.  The Persian historian of the medieval period, Firishta, has called the then Khokhar people a "race of wild barbarians without religion and morality".

History

Muhammad of Ghor undertook many campaigns against the Khokhars and defeated them in his final battle fought on the bank of Jhelum and subsequently ordered a general massacre of their populace. While returning back to Ghazna, he was assassinated at Dhamiak located in the Salt Range in March 1206 by the Qarmatians whom he persecuted during his reign. Some later acoounts attributed the assassination of Muhammad of Ghor to the Hindu Khokhars, however these later accounts are not corroborated by early Persian chroniclers who confirmed that his assassins were from the rival Ismāʿīlīyah sect of Shia Muslims. 

During his final campaign, Muhammad also took many of the  Khokars as prisoners who were later converted to Islam. During the same expedition, he also converted many other Khokhars and Buddhists who lived between Ghazna and Punjab. According to the Persian chroniclers "about three or four lakhs of infidels who wore the sacred thread were made Muslamans during this campaign". The 16th century historian Ferishta states - "most of the infidels who resided between the mountains of Ghazna and Indus were converted to the true faith (Islam)".

Under Delhi Sultanate
In 1240 CE, Razia, daughter of Shams-ud-din Iltutmish, and her husband, Altunia, attempted to recapture the throne from her brother, Muizuddin Bahram Shah. She is reported to have led an army composed mostly of mercenaries from the Khokhars of Punjab.  From 1246 to 1247, Balban mounted an expedition as far as the Salt Range to eliminate the Khokhars which he saw as a threat.

Although Lahore was controlled by the government in Delhi in 1251, it remained in ruins for the next twenty years, being attacked multiple times by the Mongols and their Khokhar allies. Around the same time, a Mongol commander named Hulechu occupied Lahore, and forged an alliance with Khokhar chief  Gul Khokhar, the erstwhile ally of Muhammad's father.

The governor of Nagaur, Rajasthan, appointed by the Tughlaq dynasty of the Delhi Sultanate was Jalal Khan Khokhar. Jalal Khan Khokhar married the sister of the wife of Rana Chunda, the ruler of the emergent Marwar kingdom. Rana Chunda was killed in a battle against Jalal Khokhar. 

There are multiple theories of origin of Khizr Khan, the viceroy of Timur in Delhi and founder of the Sayyid dynasty of the Delhi Sultanate, according to Richard M. Eaton, Khizr Khan was a Khokhar chieftain, who travelled to Samarkand and profited from the contacts he made with the Timurid society.

Independent Chieftains
Mustafa Jasrat Khokhar (sometimes Jasrath or Dashrath) was the son of Shaikha Khokhar. He became leader of the Khokhars after the death of Shaikha Khokhar. Later, he returned to Punjab. He supported Shahi Khan in the war for control of Kashmir against Ali Shah of Sayyid dynasty and was later rewarded for his victory. Later, he attempted to conquer Delhi, after the death of Khizr Khan. He succeeded only partially, while winning campaigns at Talwandi and Jullundur, he was hampered by seasonal rains in his attempt to take over Sirhind.

Colonial era
In reference to the British Raj's recruitment policies in the Punjab Province of colonial India, vis-à-vis the British Indian Army, Tan Tai Yong remarks: In reference to the historical residence of Khokhars at their traditional seat, the Salt Range:

See also 
 List of Rulers of Pothohar Plateau
 Tribes and clans of the Pothohar Plateau
 List of Punjabi tribes

References

Citations

Bibliography 

 

 

Social groups of Punjab, India
Social groups of Haryana
Indian surnames
Hindu surnames
Punjabi-language surnames
Punjabi tribes
Social groups of Punjab, Pakistan